Vasyl Mykhaylovych Hakman (born 16 May 2000) is a Ukrainian professional footballer who plays as a right-back for Bukovyna Chernivtsi.

References

External links
 
 
 

2000 births
Living people
Sportspeople from Chernivtsi Oblast
Ukrainian footballers
Association football defenders
FC Bukovyna Chernivtsi players
Ukrainian Second League players